The Journal of Quantitative Criminology is a quarterly peer-reviewed academic journal in the field of criminology. It was established in 1985 and is published by Springer Science+Business Media. The editors-in-chief are John MacDonald and Greg Ridgeway (University of Pennsylvania).

Abstracting and indexing
The journal is abstracted and indexed in:

According to the Journal Citation Reports, the journal has a 2020 impact factor of 4.239.

References

External links

Criminology journals
Springer Science+Business Media academic journals
Quarterly journals
Publications established in 1985
English-language journals